Christ Church Fulwood is a large conservative evangelical Anglican parish church of the Church of England situated in Fulwood, Sheffield, England. The Revd Canon Paul Williams was vicar at Christ Church from 2006 to 2021.

History
Christ Church, Fulwood, was built on a piece of land known locally as "Round Stubbing". It was endowed by Phoebe Silcock of Whiteley Wood Hall who donated the land and gave £2,200 for the construction of the church. The transportation of the stone was done gratuitously by local farmers. The first stone was laid on 16 August 1837 by the Reverend W. V. Bagshawe. The Fulwood parish was created in 1839, being the largest in Sheffield covering 19 square miles, taking in large areas of moorland extending out to Stanage Edge and Ringinglow.  The church registers date from 1838 for baptisms, 1839 for burials and 1851 for marriages.

The church was originally built by R. Potter. In 1953 a south aisle designed by George Pace was added and the east end and chancel were extended. A new vestry and choir vestry were also added. In 1981 a north aisle, north gallery, rear stairs and turrets were added, designed by Ronald Sims. It became Grade II listed on 28 June 1973.

The land for the first vicarage in Stumperlowe Lane was again donated by Phoebe Silcock with the cost of construction being covered by public subscription in 1839. Silcock's generosity was remembered in the church's original east window which represented acts of charity. The window was removed during the 1953 enlargement and there is now a copper tablet near the pulpit commemorating  Silcock as the foundress of the church.

Present
The church holds three services on Sundays, at 9.15 am, 11.00 am and 6.30 pm, which include facilities for babies, children, teenagers, students and internationals. Students meet midweek for bible studies at "Students at 7", which takes place each week during term time. A large number of the congregation also meet midweek in homes for small group Bible study.

Many regular activities also take place throughout the week including baby and toddler groups, children's and youth clubs, bereavement care, the Christianity Explored course and a "Friday Club" lunch for senior citizens.

Christ Church Fulwood's most popular annual event is the Carols by Candlelight services held each December.

Christ Church is within the conservative evangelical tradition of the Church of England, and consequently it has passed resolutions to reject the ordination of women and/or female leadership. It's teaching include an "orthodox view on human sexuality" and complementarian roles for men and women. The parish receives alternative episcopal oversight from the Bishop of Maidstone (currently Rod Thomas). During the 2022 installation of its new vicar, the Bishop of Sheffield and the Archdeacon of Sheffield were disinvited, with the installation being undertaken solely by the Bishop of Maidstone.

List of vicars
 Jonny Dyer (2022-present)
 Paul Williams (2005-2021)
Hugh Palmer (1997–2005). Until 2020 rector of All Souls Church, Langham Place
 Philip Hacking (1969–1997)
 Douglas-Jones (?-1969)
 Laurence Philipps "Laurie" Sheath
 Lawrence Christian Peto (1922–1938)
 Henry Brooke Worthington (1916–1922)
 James White Merryweather (1912–1916)
 Edmund "John" Howe Hewlett (1877–1911)
 Edmund Boteler Chalmer (1844–1877)
 Richard Walker (1837-1844)

See also
List of works by George Pace

References

Churches in Sheffield
Grade II listed buildings in Sheffield
History of Sheffield
Churches completed in 1839
19th-century Church of England church buildings
Sheffield
Grade II listed churches in South Yorkshire
1839 establishments in England
Fulwood, Sheffield